Nof Ayalon (lit. Ayalon View) is a community settlement in central Israel. Located in the Ayalon Valley near Sha'alvim, it falls under the jurisdiction of the Gezer Regional Council.

History
During the Ottoman period, the area belonged to the Nahiyeh (sub-district) of Lod that encompassed the area of the present-day city of Modi'in-Maccabim-Re'ut in the south to the present-day city of El'ad in the north, and from the foothills in the east, through the Lod Valley to the outskirts of Jaffa in the west. This area was home to thousands of inhabitants in about 20 villages, who had at their disposal tens of thousands of hectares of prime agricultural land.

The locality was established in 1994 by the administration of Yeshivat Sha'alvim.

Notable residents
Naftali Fraenkel, 16-year-old killed in the 2014 kidnapping and murder of Israeli teenagers
Rachelle Fraenkel, teacher of rabbinic literature, yoetzet halakhah, mother of Naftali.

References

External links
Official website 

Community settlements
Populated places established in 1994
Populated places in Central District (Israel)
1994 establishments in Israel